Jack Straw (born 1946) is a British politician.

Jack Straw may also refer to:

 Jack Straw (rebel leader) (died 1381), leader of the 1381 Peasants' Revolt
 "Jack Straw" (song), a 1971 song by the Grateful Dead
 Jack Straw, a 1908 play by W. Somerset Maugham
 Jack Straw (film), a 1920 silent film comedy, based on the play
 Jackstraws, the game pick-up sticks
 Jack Straw's Lane, in Oxford, England, named after a farmer called Jack Straw
 Jack Straw's Castle, Hampstead, a former pub